Bårjås is a popular scientific journal that has been published once a year in Lule Sámi and Norwegian by the Árran Lule Sami Center and museum in the village of Drag in Tysfjord, Norway since 1999. As of 2009 the magazine was edited by Lars Magne Andreassen and Ronny Nergård.

References

Culture in Nordland
Lule Sámi
Sámi in Norway
Sámi magazines
Magazines established in 1999
Annual magazines
Popular science magazines
1999 establishments in Norway